Linn is an unincorporated community in Gilmer County, West Virginia, United States. Linn has a post office with ZIP code 26384.

The community was named after Robert George Linn, an early settler.

References

Unincorporated communities in Gilmer County, West Virginia
Unincorporated communities in West Virginia